Kennard Devane Cox (born August 17, 1985) is a former American football cornerback who played in the National Football League (NFL). He was drafted by the Buffalo Bills in the seventh round of the 2008 NFL Draft. He played college football at Pittsburgh.

Cox was also a member of the Green Bay Packers, Jacksonville Jaguars, and Seattle Seahawks.

Professional career

Buffalo Bills
Following the 2008 NFL Draft, Cox was signed by the Buffalo Bills as an undrafted free agent on June 2, 2008. He was released on August 26.

Green Bay Packers
Cox was signed to the Green Bay Packers' practice squad on October 27, 2008.

Jacksonville Jaguars
Cox was signed off the Packers' practice squad by the Jacksonville Jaguars on December 8, 2008.

Cox was waived on September 7, 2009, and subsequently signed to the team's practice squad. He was promoted to the active roster on September 15. He was waived again on September 28 and later re-signed to the practice squad. He was promoted to the active roster on December 5, and waived again on December 11. He was again signed back to the practice squad. He was promoted to the active roster on December 17, and waived two days later on December 19. He was re-signed to the practice squad on December 22, only to be promoted to the active roster again on January 2, 2010 after defensive tackle Atiyyah Ellison was placed on injured reserve.

Seattle Seahawks
Cox signed with the Seattle Seahawks on April 16, 2010. He was released on September 14. He was re-signed to the practice squad on September 16. He was signed to the active roster on October 12 and has appeared in each game since on special teams duty - blocking a punt on November 28, 2010 against the Kansas City Chiefs. He was released on September 3, 2011, but was re-signed on September 17.

Kansas City Chiefs
On August 14, 2013, Cox was signed by the Kansas City Chiefs.

Personal life
Cox is a cousin of three fellow NFL players—cornerback Torrie Cox, cornerback Marcus Hudson and wide receiver Roscoe Parrish.

References

External links
Seattle Seahawks bio
Pittsburgh Panthers bio

1985 births
Living people
Miami Killian Senior High School alumni
Players of American football from Miami
American football cornerbacks
American football safeties
Pittsburgh Panthers football players
Buffalo Bills players
Jacksonville Jaguars players
Seattle Seahawks players
Kansas City Chiefs players
Green Bay Packers players